Thermoniphas fontainei is a butterfly in the family Lycaenidae. It is found in Gabon, the Republic of the Congo, the Democratic Republic of the Congo (Mayumbe, Kinshasa, Equateur, Ituri, Tshopo, Sankuru, Lomami and Lualaba), Tanzania and Zambia.

References

Butterflies described in 1956
Thermoniphas